The Scala Cinema was a thousand-seat movie theater in Bangkok, Thailand, named after the Teatro alla Scala, Milan's opera house. Scala opened on 31 December 1969 with a screening of The Undefeated (1969), a US Western starring John Wayne and Rock Hudson. It closed on 5 July 2020, showing, as its last film, Cinema Paradiso. The Scala, called "...the finest movie theater left in Southeast Asia" was the last stand-alone cinema in Bangkok, down from roughly 140 movie houses in the 1950s and 1960s.

History 
Scala, in the Siam Square shopping area, was one of the Apex group of cinemas which included Siam Cinema, Lido Cinema, and Scala. The 800-seat Siam Cinema opened on 15 December 1966 with The Battle of the Bulge as its first screening. Siam burnt down during the 2010 Thai political protests. In 1968, the Apex Group built the 1000-seat Lido Cinema. It closed its doors when its lease expired in May 2018, but was reopened in 2019 as a performing arts venue, Lido Connect.

The Scala was the last remaining standalone single-screen cinema in Bangkok, offering film aficionados a retro film-going experience. The president of Apex attributed Scala's closing to the impact of the COVID-19 pandemic and changing consumer preferences. Its last screening was shown amid rumours that the building will be demolished to make way for new development.

Designed by architect Chira Silpakanok, the building is late-Modernist in design with interior decorations in the Art Deco style. A grand staircase dominated the interior, illuminated by a huge Italian chandelier. The cinema received the ASA Architectural Conservation Award in 2012. The building's future is uncertain as Chulalongkorn University, owners of the property, searches for a new tenant. 
The Scala hosted film festivals such as the Bangkok International Film Festival, the Silent Film Festival, and was itself the subject of a documentary film shown at the Salaya International Documentary Film Festival in 2016.

Final films

On Scala's last day, four movies curated by the Thai Film Archive were shown. They included two Italian classics by Michelangelo Antonioni: Blowup at noon; followed by a double-bill of Thai documentaries The Scala, and Phantom of Illumination, which pay homage to standalone movie theaters at 15:00; and Antonioni's Cinema Paradiso, Scala's last film, at 18:00.

Death of the Thai grand cinema
In the heyday of big screen cinema, there were 700 stand-alone cinemas in Thailand, according to cinema historian Philip Jablon. One hundred-forty of them were in Bangkok alone. By 2019, only three remained in Thailand: the Scala in Bangkok, Det Udom Mini Theatre in Ubon Ratchathani, and Chum Phae Cineplex in Khon Kaen. Jablon observes that, "What's surprising is that it went from so many to [almost] zero," he said. "I can't think of anywhere else that this kind of culture, technology and buildings have completely disappeared. All over the world, stand-alone movie theatres have declined. But I don't know anywhere it declined to the point of being extinct, except Thailand. It's funny because people still go to the movies in Thailand. Thailand has a strong film industry and also imports a lot of movies. Yet, the old-fashioned way of watching a movie has completely died."

Writer Sonthaya Subyen, together with his colleague Morimart Raden-Ahmad, set out to capture what remains of Thailand's cinemas for their 2014 book, Once Upon a Celluloid Planet: Where Cinema Ruled. "Stand-alone theaters used to be city landmarks and the only mass entertainment place for people of all ages," he observed. According to the authors, stand-alone theaters flourished in Thailand between the 1950s and the 1970s before seeing attendance decline in the 1980s with the coming of VHS tapes. "Similar to attending temple fairs, locals dressed up to go to stand-alone theaters". Usually found in city centers near central markets, theaters became community gathering points. "They supported one another, the theater and the community."

Notes
1.  Some sources claim 800 seats, other sources say 1,000 seats.

References

External links
 

Cinemas in Thailand
Demolished buildings and structures in Bangkok
Pathum Wan district
Modernist architecture in Thailand
Former cinemas